
BPO can refer to:

Orchestras
 Belgrade Philharmonic Orchestra
 Berlin Philharmonic Orchestra
 Boston Philharmonic Orchestra
 Boston Pops Orchestra
 Brisbane Philharmonic Orchestra
 Brussels Philharmonic Orchestra
 Budapest Philharmonic Orchestra
 Buffalo Philharmonic Orchestra

Business and finance
 British Post Office former postal and telephone service provider
 Bank Payment Obligation
 Broker's Price Opinion in real estate
 Business process outsourcing

Science
 Benzoyl peroxide